Aparichita is a 1978 Kannada-language romantic  mystery thriller film directed by Kashinath, starring Suresh Heblikar, Sobha, M. V. Vasudeva Rao and Mohan. The music was composed by noted composer L. Vaidyanathan. The movie was critically acclaimed. Kashinath remade the movie in Hindi as Be-Shaque. The movie was also remade in Malayalam as Avano Atho Avalo. The movie was dubbed in Telugu as Aparichitulu. 

Director Vamsy mentioned that he liked the forest backdrop of Aparichita, and wanted to make a film which is entirely set in a forest. This eventually led him to make Anveshana (1985).

Soundtrack

Awards 
Karnataka State Film Awards 1978–79
 Best Screenplay – Kashinath
 Best Child Actor – Master Prakash

References

External links 

1978 films
1970s Kannada-language films
1970s thriller films
Indian romantic thriller films
Kannada films remade in other languages
1978 directorial debut films
Films scored by L. Vaidyanathan
Films directed by Kashinath